A Culture of Conspiracy: Apocalyptic Visions in Contemporary America is a 2003 non-fiction book written by Michael Barkun, professor emeritus of political science at the Maxwell School of Citizenship and Public Affairs.

Overview
Along with the Internet playing a key role in introducing individuals to beliefs once consigned to the outermost fringe of American political and religious life, Barkun points to the convergence of two phenomena that influence contemporary American conspiracism:
 The rise of "improvisational millennialism" — a belief in an imminent destruction of the world and the creation of a new world as a result of the triumph of good over evil, which is independent from any single religious or secular tradition (e.g., Christian premillennial dispensationalism, etc.) and indiscriminately syncretizes ideas from different traditions (e.g., Western esotericism, Eastern religions, New Age movement, fringe science, radical politics, etc.).
 The popularity of "stigmatized knowledge" — claims to the truth that the claimants regard as verified (e.g., climate change denial, location hypotheses of Atlantis, astrology, alchemy, folk medicine, alien abduction, extraterrestrial hypothesis for UFOs, suppressed cancer cures, etc.), despite the marginalization of those claims by the authoritative institutions that conventionally distinguish between knowledge and error (e.g., academia, scientific community, etc.).

Reviews
Publishers Weekly gave the book a positive review by stating "Scholarly but fluently written and free of excessive jargon, Barkun's exploration of the conspiratorial worldview combines sociological depth with a deadpan appreciation of pop culture and raises serious questions about the replacement of democracy by conspiracy as the dominant paradigm of political action in the public mind."

In a February 2004 review, writer and political blogger Daniel Pipes wrote:

See also 
 Apocalypticism
 Conspiracy theories in United States politics
 New World Order (conspiracy theory)

Books:
 The Paranoid Style in American Politics
 Among the Truthers

References

External links 
University of California Press: 
Chapter 5: 
Google Books: 
Amazon.com: Hardcover , Paperback 
C-SPAN Video Library: 

Reviews

Pipes, Daniel. [Michael Barkun on] Old Conspiracies, New Beliefs. The New York Sun (13 January 2004). Retrieved on 2011-07-12
Boyer, Paul S. The Strange World of Conspiracy Theories. The Christian Century (27 July 2004). Retrieved on 2011-07-12
Pratt, Ray. Review. The Montana Professor (Spring 2005). Retrieved on 2011-07-12
Daschkea, Dereck. A Review of. Terrorism and Political Violence. Volume 18, Issue 4 (2006). Retrieved on 2011-07-12

2003 non-fiction books
American non-fiction books
Apocalypticism
Books about conspiracy theories
Millenarianism
University of California Press books
Books about the far right
Conspiracy theories in the United States